Frauke Kreuter is a German sociologist and statistician. She is a professor of the Joint Program in Survey Methodology (JPSM) of the University of Maryland, College Park and a professor in statistics and data science at the Ludwig Maximilian University of Munich, Germany. Her research in survey methodology includes work on sampling error and observational error.

Biography
Kreuter earned a diploma in sociology from the University of Mannheim in 1996. After postdoctoral research and an adjunct position at the University of California, Los Angeles, she moved to Maryland in 2004 and joined JPSM as an assistant professor. From 2010 to 2014 she was University Professor of Statistics at the Ludwig Maximilian University of Munich, while maintaining her position at Maryland as an associate professor. She also became head of the Statistical Methods Research Department at the Institute for Employment Research (IAB) in Nuremberg, Germany in 2010. In 2014 she was promoted to full professor at Maryland and moved her German position to the University of Mannheim. From 2016 to 2020, she was director of JPSM in Maryland.

Publications
She is the author or co-author of several books, including Data Analysis Using Stata (3rd ed., Stata Press, 2012, with U. Kohler) and Practical Tools for Designing and Weighting Survey Samples (Springer, 2013, with Richard Valliant and Jill Dever).

Awards and honors
Kreuter was the 2013 winner of the Gertrude Cox Award, given jointly by the Washington Statistical Society and RTI International.
In 2014 she was elected as a Fellow of the American Statistical Association "for outstanding contributions to research in the field of survey methodology; for excellence in mentoring of junior researchers in social statistics and survey methodology; and for extensive international research collaborations." She was awarded the Warren Mitofsky Innovators Award of the American Association for Public Opinion Research in 2020.

References

External links
Home page

Year of birth missing (living people)
Living people
German statisticians
Women statisticians
German sociologists
German women sociologists
University of Mannheim alumni
University of Konstanz alumni
University of Maryland, College Park faculty
Academic staff of the Ludwig Maximilian University of Munich
Fellows of the American Statistical Association